"Let You Down" is a song performed by American rapper and songwriter NF and is his most successful song to date. It serves as the third single from his third studio album, Perception, released on September 14, 2017. Available for digital download and streaming, it also includes an audio video.

The song is NF's highest-charting song to date, peaking at No. 12 on the Billboard Hot 100 and topping the Pop Songs chart. As well as reaching mainstream charts internationally, "Let You Down" charted on Billboards Hot Christian Songs and Hot Rhythmic Songs, reaching the No. 1 spot on the former chart. It is his first song to be certified gold by the Recording Industry Association of America. It was later certified 3× platinum in the US, and also reached multi-platinum in several other countries, including Canada and Australia.

Song history
"Let You Down" was produced by David Garcia and Tommee Profitt. NF wrote the song about his relationship with his father and how he did not want to disappoint him, making it the first time he had publicly spoken about his relationship with his father, who raised him as a child. His parents went through a divorce, and his mother overdosed years later.

Music video
The official music video was released on November 9, 2017, on NF's Vevo channel.

The music video was directed and produced by Nathan Feuerstein (NF's real name) and Patrick Tohill. Given the song's lyrical content, the visual focus is on the relationship between an older Nate and his younger self. The clip shows an older man, presumably his future self, standing on a dock looking at a lake, while a fully clothed NF drowns right in front of him. As he flails and tries to keep from going under, the man just looks at him, and doesn't help. Then, the same man is seen staring at NF who is trapped in a burning car. As it's engulfed in flames, the man again makes no move to help. Then we see the older man in a field, staring into a freshly dug grave. Inside the grave is a coffin, and NF is inside, dead. The older man seems upset by this, and falls to his knees. In the final shot, the older man is back on the dock, looking at NF drowning once again. The camera switches views to an identical tattoo that NF has. Then a woman approaches him on the dock and says, "Nathan?"

Track listing

Chart performance
"Let You Down" reached No. 1 on the Hot Christian Songs and Mainstream Top 40 charts. It also reached No. 12 on the US Billboard Hot 100, NF's first entry on the chart. The song achieved international success, charting in the UK, Australia, Belgium, Canada, Norway, the Netherlands, Sweden, Switzerland, New Zealand and Ireland.

Charts

Weekly charts

Year-end charts

Certifications

Release history

See also 
 List of best-selling singles in the United States

References

2017 singles
2017 songs
NF (rapper) songs
Songs written by NF (rapper)
Songs written by Tommee Profitt
Capitol Records singles
Caroline Records singles